CFBR-FM is a Canadian radio station, broadcasting an active rock format at 100.3 FM in Edmonton, Alberta. The station uses its on-air brand name 100.3 The Bear and is owned by Bell Media.

History
The station was launched in 1951 by Sunwapta Broadcasting as CFRN-FM, simulcasting the AM programming of CFRN. It launched separate programming in 1964, and adopted the callsign CKXM in 1979. The station was sold to CAP Communications in 1988 and adopted the callsign CJKE the following year.

The station was acquired by Standard Broadcasting in 1992, and adopted the current CFBR callsign, rock format and "Bear" branding in September of that year.

On September 28, 2007, the CRTC approved the sale of CFBR and all Standard Radio assets to Astral Media.

On June 27, 2013, the CRTC approved the sale of all but 10 Astral Media Radio Stations to BCE (Bell Media). The sale including CFBR.

CFBR is rebroadcast in Jasper on 92.3 FM.

In 2008, CFBR was rated as the third most listened-to station in the Edmonton market.  But by the Fall 2011 book, it had dropped to #6.

As of February 28, 2021, CFBR is the 9th-most-listened-to radio station in the Edmonton market according to a PPM data report released by Numeris.

Notes
CFBR used to be the call sign of an AM station in Brockville, Ontario, known today as CFJR-FM, and was also a call sign of an AM radio station in Sudbury that is now known as CHYC-FM.

References

External links
 
 
 

Fbr
Fbr
Fbr
Radio stations established in 1951
1951 establishments in Alberta